Pseudonectria is a genus of fungi in the family Nectriaceae.

Species
Pseudonectria aquifolii
Pseudonectria bambusae
Pseudonectria bambusina
Pseudonectria callorioides
Pseudonectria casaresii
Pseudonectria ciliata
Pseudonectria coffeicola
Pseudonectria collorioides
Pseudonectria furfurella
Pseudonectria gigaspora
Pseudonectria maranhensis
Pseudonectria musae
Pseudonectria ornata
Pseudonectria pachysandricola
Pseudonectria pipericola
Pseudonectria reticulospora
Pseudonectria rousseliana
Pseudonectria strasseri
Pseudonectria sulphurata
Pseudonectria tabacina
Pseudonectria tilachlidii

External links
 

Nectriaceae genera